The 1978 New Hampshire gubernatorial election took place on November 6, 1978.

Incumbent Republican Governor Meldrim Thomson Jr., who defeated former governor Wesley Powell for the Republican nomination, ran for a fourth term in office, but was defeated by State Representative Hugh Gallen.

Election results

References

See also

New Hampshire
1978
Gubernatorial